Valeri Valeryevich Solyanik (born December 1, 1966) is a retired Russian professional football player. Before joining FC Kristall at the age of 27 he played on amateur level in local competitions.

Career
Solyanik is the leading goal-scorer in the history of Smolensk football. He scored 161 goals for FC Kristall Smolensk playing the Russian First Division, Russian Second Division and Russian Third Division. He also scored five goals playing for FC Smolensk.

Honours
 Russian Third League Zone 4 top scorer: 1994 (24 goals).

References

External links
 

1966 births
Living people
Soviet footballers
Russian footballers
Russian football managers
FC Kristall Smolensk players
Sportspeople from Smolensk
Association football forwards